Clytiomya continua is a European species of fly in the family Tachinidae. Hosts for the parasitoid larvae include Coreus marginatus orientalis, Eurygaster testudinaria, Eurydema gebleri, Eurydema dominulus, Graphosoma rubrolineatum, Homalogonia confusa, and Dolycoris baccarum. Larval development takes six to eleven days.

References

Phasiinae
Diptera of Europe
Insects described in 1798
Taxa named by Georg Wolfgang Franz Panzer